The Tengzhou East railway station is a high-speed railway station in Tengzhou, Shandong, People's Republic of China. It is served by the Beijing–Shanghai high-speed railway.

Railway stations in Shandong
Railway stations in China opened in 2010